Douglas Lim (born 11 October 1977) is a Malaysian actor, comedian, television presenter and emcee. He is well known for his involvement in local television, theater and film and comedy show.

Early life
Lim was born on 11 October 1977 in Kuala Lumpur. He received his secondary education at the Victoria Institution, Kuala Lumpur and went on to study at Canterbury Christian Church University.

Career
During his two years of matriculation studies, he appeared in the Kopitiam sitcom and decided to become an actor because he believed it was the best choice. He also sang the theme song of this sitcom, "Empty Decorations" together with Chelsia Ng. His face soon appeared in the same series as the character of a barber shop owner named Steven. His performance in Kopitiam earned Douglas to be nominated for the Best Actor (Comedy) category at the Asian Television Awards.

In addition, Lim is also one of the main local Chinese comedies titled Homecoming  aired on Astro Wah Lai Toi. He has also starred in several TV commercials including Petronas, TM, Nestlé, Sime Darby, Maybank, HSBC and UEM. In addition to being a stand-up comedian, his performance as an emcee are also needed by several companies that are seen as a catalyst for their success.

He acted in the historical film 1957: Hati Malaya directed by Shuhaimi Baba in which Lim played the role of an MCA member. On 15 January 2008, Lim produced and hosted the Malaysiantalents.com program for the broadcast on the web portal gua.com.my.

In 2009, Lim founded the Chinese Comedian Association of Malaysia, one of the most successful stand-up comedy branch in Malaysia. In addition to acting and presenting career, Lim is also a theater performer; in March 2011, he performed the musical show Lat Kampung Boy: Sebuah Muzikal (Lat Village Boy: A Musical) staged at the Istana Budaya from 16 March to 3 April 2011; He plays as Frankie, the childhood friend of cartoonist Lat. The show also starred Awie, Jalil Hamid, Rahim Razali and Atilia Haron.

He also contributed his voice for the 2013 animated film Bola Kampung: The Movie produced by Animasia Studio, an adaptation of the animated series Bola Kampung. Other actors who contributed their voices were Afdlin Shauki, Aznil Nawawi, Aizat Amdan, Deanna Yusoff and Marsha Milan Londoh.

From 6 to 18 November 2013, Lim became part of the special theater award actor for Malaysian national football legend Mokhtar Dahari, Supermokh Sebuah Muzikal, staged at the Istana Budaya.

Two years later, Lim shared the stage with Afdlin Shauki, the Bocey comedian trio and Harith Iskander in a Lawak Ke Der staging at the Panggung Sari, Istana Budaya. Lim plays the role of Jackie in the movie Soulmate Hingga Jannah, directed by Abdul Razak Mohaideen aired on 16 February 2017.

Douglas is one of the actors involved in the Spanar Jaya X sitcom that airs on TV3 from February to April 2019. Directed by Ahmad Idham (original cast of Spanar Jaya), the sitcom also stars Ben Amir, Uqasha Senrose and Sangeeta Krishnasamy.

Douglas is one of the lead cast for the live-action theater of Ola Bola: The Musical, which runs from 18 February to 3 March 2019 at the Istana Budaya. The cast includes Luqman Hafidz, Iedil Putra, Hafeez Mikail, Tony Eusoff and Nabila Huda.

He is one of the co-starring cast of Kopitiam: Double Shot, which airs on Viu on 28 November 2019. It is the latest version of the Kopitiam sitcom.

Personal life
Lim is married to Natasha Fernz on 12 May 2007.

Filmography

Film

Theater

Telemovie

Television

Radiography

Radio

Discography

References

External links
 Official website
 

1977 births
Living people
People from Kuala Lumpur
Malaysian people of Chinese descent
Malaysian Christians
Malaysian male actors
Malaysian television actors
Malaysian film actors
Malaysian stage actors
Malaysian television presenters
Malaysian comedians
Malaysian stand-up comedians
21st-century comedians